MSU Faculty of chemistry - the Faculty of Moscow State University. Established at 1929. Dean - professor Stepan Kalmykov.

Nowadays there about 1800 employees at the faculty, among them are 315 professors and over 800 engineers and research workers and 23 members of Russian Academy of Sciences

Departments

Department of analytical chemistry
Department of colloidal chemistry
Department of inorganic chemistry
Department of organic chemistry
Department of physical chemistry
Department of chemistry of oil and organic catalysis
Department of the English language
Department of chemical kinetics
Department of chemical enzymologie
Department of high-molecular compounds
Department of laser chemistry
Department of general chemistry
Department of radio-chemistry
Department of chemistry of natural compounds
Department of chemical technology and new materials
Department of electro-chemistry

Notable alumni

Ilya Vasilyevich Berezin
Valeriy Valentinovich Efremov
Vladimir Isaevich Feldman
Vasily Semyonovich Grossman
Miliana Kroumova Kaisheva
Viktor Aleksandrovich Kabanov
Bonifatiy Mikhaylovich Kedrov
Yuriy Anatolyevich Ovchinnikov
Nikolay Alfredovich Plate
Mikhail Alekseevich Prokofyev
Evgeniy Dmitrievich Schukin
Viktor Ivanovich Spitsyn
Yuriy Timofeevich Struchkov
Aleksandr Ivanovich Zaytsev

Nikolay Serafimovich Zefirov

External links

Chemistry, Faculty of
Education in Moscow